Jakub Koreis (born June 26, 1984) is a Czech professional ice hockey centre currently playing with HC Kometa Brno in the Czech Extraliga.

He was drafted in the first round, 19th overall, by the Phoenix Coyotes in the 2002 NHL Entry Draft.  Whilst in the Coyotes system, Koreis played with American Hockey League affiliate, the San Antonio Rampage, before leaving North America at the end of his entry level contract with the Coyotes unable to debut in the National Hockey League.

On September 3, 2014, Koreis signed a three-month trial contract with EC KAC of the Austrian Hockey League (EBEL). After only 6 games with Klagenfurt, Koreis opted to terminate his contract and return to former Czech club, HC Kometa Brno on October 7, 2014.

Career statistics

Regular season and playoffs

International

References

External links
 

1984 births
Living people
Arizona Coyotes draft picks
Czech ice hockey centres
Guelph Storm players
Ilves players
EC KAC players
HC Kometa Brno players
National Hockey League first-round draft picks
HC Plzeň players
San Antonio Rampage players
HC Sparta Praha players
Utah Grizzlies (AHL) players
Sportspeople from Plzeň
Czech expatriate ice hockey players in Canada
Czech expatriate ice hockey players in the United States
Czech expatriate ice hockey players in Finland
Expatriate ice hockey players in Austria
Czech expatriate sportspeople in Austria